The Stewartry of Annandale was created in 1312, when the Lordship of Annandale, Scotland was granted to Thomas Randolph, 1st Earl of Moray. A steward was appointed to administer the area, with the office was known a "stewartry".

Stewarts of Annandale
Adam of Corry, c.1330
Herbert Maxwell of Caerlaverock, 1409
Herbert Maxwell, Lord Maxwell, 1440
Robert Maxwell, Lord Maxwell, 1454
Aymer Gladstone – 1454 – deputy
Herbert Gladstone – 1454 – deputy
John Maxwell, Lord Maxwell, 1460
Patrick Andrew Wentworth Hope-Johnstone, 2019

Citations

References

Annandale and Eskdale
1312 establishments
Sheriff courts